The Haragîș helicopter crash happened on June 2, 2016, when a Romanian helicopter belonging to the SMURD emergency rescue service crashed near the village of Haragîș in Cantemir District  while performing a rescue mission in Moldova.

The helicopter had saved a life earlier that day by delivering a patient to Chișinău, then it refuelled and took off for the next patient, located in the southern city of Cahul. While en route to Cahul the aircraft crashed in Cantemir District due to poor weather conditions. All 4 crew members died:
Adrian-Gabriel Sandu, nurse
Mihaela Dumea, physician
Constantin Voicu Șocae, copilot
Ilie Doru Gavril, pilot

All of them were decorated post-mortem with high honors by the President of Romania Klaus Iohannis and the President of Moldova Nicolae Timofti. In June 2017, a commemorative stamp was issued in Moldova depicting the crew members and the helicopter.

References 

2016 in Moldova
2016 in Romania
Aviation accidents and incidents in 2016
Aviation accidents and incidents in Moldova
Accidents and incidents involving the Eurocopter EC135